The following lists events that happened in 1978 in Libya.

Incumbents
 President: Muammar al-Gaddafi
 Prime Minister: Abdul Ati al-Obeidi

Events

January
 29 January.  Libyan ground units attacks government forces in northern Chad: Faya-Largeau, Fada and Ounianga Kebir in support of rebels. The attacks were successful, and Libya assumed temporary control of the BET Prefecture, and control of the Aouzou Strip ending in 1987.

July
 Libya and India signs a memorandum of understanding to cooperate in peaceful applications of nuclear energy as part of India's Atom of Peace policy.

October
 Libyan troops are sent to aid Idi Amin in the Uganda–Tanzania War when Amin tried to annex the northern Tanzanian province of Kagera, and Tanzania counterattacked. Amin lost the battle and later fled to exile in Libya, where he remained for almost a year.

 
Years of the 20th century in Libya
Libya
Libya
1970s in Libya